Clarence Edgar Goodson IV (born May 17, 1982) is an American former soccer player who played as a defender.

Youth career
Born in Alexandria, Virginia, Goodson attended Annandale High School his freshman and sophomore seasons before moving to Wilbert Tucker Woodson High School. He was the Annandale team MVP, setting a school record for goals and points by a sophomore in 1998. He then went on to win the Virginia State High School Soccer title playing for W.T. Woodson High School in 2000. He played his club soccer with the Braddock Road Warhawks, winning the 1999 U-17 national championship. Goodson played three years of soccer at the University of Maryland, which he joined in 2000. After redshirting in 2001, Goodson helped anchor the defense of one of the best teams in college soccer. In his career at Maryland, Goodson played 66 games, registering 10 goals and 11 assists. In 2003, he spent the collegiate offseason with the Boulder Rapids Reserve.

Club career
After his junior year, Goodson signed a Project-40 with Major League Soccer (MLS), entering the 2004 MLS SuperDraft as an underclassman, where he was drafted seventh overall by the Dallas Burn. In his first year with the Burn, Goodson played only 247 league minutes in five games; however, he saw extended action in Cup competitions and exhibitions. He became a starter in 2005, the year the team was renamed FC Dallas.

On November 21, 2007, Goodson was selected by the San Jose Earthquakes in the 2007 MLS Expansion Draft but declared that he would not be signing a new contract with MLS in January 2008; instead, he signed a contract with the Norwegian team IK Start. He remained with Start through the 2010 season. In November 2010, Goodson signed with Brøndby of the Danish Superliga.

Goodson returned to MLS on June 28, 2013 when he signed with San Jose Earthquakes.

Goodson served as an elected Board Member for the Major League Soccer Players Association (Union) and was a critical leader to establish a new Collective Bargaining Agreement for MLS athletes.

International
Goodson made his international debut in a friendly against Sweden on January 19, 2008. He was a member of the U.S. squad at the 2009 CONCACAF Gold Cup, and scored in the semifinal against Honduras on July 23, 2009. On May 26, 2010, Goodson was selected to be part of the 23 man roster for the American national team at the 2010 FIFA World Cup in South Africa.

Goodson served as an elected Union Representative for US Soccer.

Goodson has been used in the rotation of Centerbacks for the U.S. Men's National Team under Jürgen Klinsmann. Goodson was named to the United States roster for the 2013 CONCACAF Gold Cup competition. He was included on Klinsmann's 30-man preliminary roster for the US team at the 2014 FIFA World Cup, but he was not included on the final roster.

International goals

Honours
 CONCACAF Gold Cup All-Tournament Team: 2009

Retirement
Goodson retired from professional soccer after a spinal injury in December, 2016. Goodson now works professionally as a players relations manager for MLSPA. He stays active coaching soccer in his community.

Goodson and wife Kelsey, in partnership with the US Soccer Foundation, built a soccer field at his childhood school, North Springfield Elementary School. The Clarence Goodson Field is used to serve underprivileged youth in his childhood neighborhood. The "Mini-Pitch Initiative" is to create a safe space in the community to play, be coached, mentored, and learn the benefits nutrition and exercise, specifically serving US Soccer Foundation Soccer youth teams for underprivileged youth. His generous contribution has inspired other current and former professional athletes to build mini-pitch's in their communities as well. The couple are licensed ministers and serve as Youth Directors in San Jose, California. Goodson is a public and motivational speaker, focusing on teams and youth development.

Personal
Goodson married Kelsey Dawson on January 31, 2009, in Tacoma, Washington.
The couple were featured on an episode of HGTV's House Hunters International, searching for an apartment in Copenhagen after Goodson's transfer to Brøndby IF. He purchased an apartment valued at $900,000.

Goodson is a Christian. Goodson participates in a weekly team Bible study.

Career statistics

Honors

International
United States
 CONCACAF Gold Cup: 2013; runner-up 2009, 2011

References

External links

1982 births
Living people
Sportspeople from Alexandria, Virginia
American soccer players
American expatriate soccer players
Colorado Rapids U-23 players
FC Dallas players
IK Start players
Brøndby IF players
San Jose Earthquakes players
Maryland Terrapins men's soccer players
United States men's international soccer players
2009 CONCACAF Gold Cup players
2010 FIFA World Cup players
2011 CONCACAF Gold Cup players
2013 CONCACAF Gold Cup players
CONCACAF Gold Cup-winning players
FC Dallas draft picks
Expatriate footballers in Norway
Expatriate men's footballers in Denmark
Soccer players from Alexandria, Virginia
American expatriate sportspeople in Norway
USL League Two players
Major League Soccer players
Eliteserien players
Danish Superliga players
Association football defenders
Annandale High School alumni
Wilbert Tucker Woodson High School alumni